John Isaac "Ike" Moore (February 7, 1856 – March 18, 1937) was a member of the Arkansas Senate and acting governor of the U.S. state of Arkansas.

Biography
Moore was born in Lafayette County, Mississippi, and graduated from the University of Arkansas in 1881. He studied law and was admitted to the Arkansas bar in 1882. He died on March 18, 1937.

Career
From 1894 to 1900, Moore served as probate judge in Phillips County, Arkansas. He was elected to the Arkansas House of Representatives in 1882, 1901, and 1903. In 1903, he served as speaker of the house.

Moore was elected to the Arkansas Senate in 1904. He served in the Senate in 1905, 1907, 1913, and 1915.

On February 11, 1907, Governor John Sebastian Little resigned from office due to mental and physical illness. Moore, who was president of the Senate at the time, became acting governor. He served as governor until the legislature adjourned on 14 May 1907.

Moore later served as a member of the Arkansas Board of State capital commissioners. He was a member of the Arkansas Constitutional Convention from 1917 to 1918.

See also
List of governors of Arkansas

References

External links
 National Governors Association
 State of Arkansas Governors

  Acting Governor

1856 births
1937 deaths
19th-century American politicians
20th-century American politicians
Acting Governors of Arkansas
Democratic Party Arkansas state senators
Democratic Party governors of Arkansas
People from Lafayette County, Mississippi
People from Phillips County, Arkansas
Place of death missing
Speakers of the Arkansas House of Representatives
Democratic Party members of the Arkansas House of Representatives
University of Arkansas alumni